Martina Pötschke-Langer (born 1951) is a German public health activist.

Pötschke-Langer studied at the University of Heidelberg. She became head of the Cancer Prevention Unit at the German Cancer Research Center ("") in 1997. She became an advisor to the World Health Organization (WHO) in 1999 and in 2002 was made head of the WHO Collaborating Centre for Tobacco Control.

She was awarded the Order of the Cross of Merit on Ribbon by the Federal Republic of Germany in 2007, for her work on cancer prevention and non-smokers' rights. She also received the WHO's Tobacco Free World Award for her "outstanding contributions to public health", in 1999; and jointly with her colleagues in 2007 and 2011. She is an honorary member of the German Association of Pulmonology.

References

External links 

 
 
  2015 interview (in German)

1951 births
Place of birth missing (living people)
Living people
20th-century German scientists
21st-century German scientists
Heidelberg University alumni
World Health Organization officials
German officials of the United Nations
Recipients of the Cross of the Order of Merit of the Federal Republic of Germany